In dermatology, a mole map is a medical record which records an image and the location of lesions and/or moles, or dark spots on the human body.  Such a record is useful for diagnosis of cancer a priori (i.e. direct diagnosis) or as a baseline which can be compared against later images to determine when there has been a visual change which may indicate cancer.

Dermatologic terminology